Foster is an unincorporated community in  Foster Township, Big Stone, Minnesota, United States.

History
Foster was platted in 1880. It was named for Foster L. Balch.

Notes

Unincorporated communities in Big Stone County, Minnesota
Unincorporated communities in Minnesota